The 2022 Open Internacional de San Sebastián was a professional tennis tournament played on outdoor clay courts. It was the first edition of the tournament which was part of the 2022 ITF Women's World Tennis Tour. It took place in San Sebastián, Spain between 26 September and 2 October 2022.

Champions

Singles

  Julia Grabher def.  Aliona Bolsova, 6–3, 7–6(7–3)

Doubles

  Aliona Bolsova /  Katarina Zavatska def.  Ángela Fita Boluda /  Guiomar Maristany, 1–2, ret.

Singles main draw entrants

Seeds

 1 Rankings are as of 19 September 2022.

Other entrants
The following players received wildcards into the singles main draw:
  Lucía Cortez Llorca
  Victoria Jiménez Kasintseva
  Carlota Martínez Círez
  Ane Mintegi del Olmo

The following players received entry into the singles main draw using a protected ranking:
  Emiliana Arango

The following players received entry from the qualifying draw:
  Amira Benaïssa
  Nahia Berecoechea
  Oana Gavrilă
  Jasmin Jebawy
  Nadiya Kolb
  Amandine Monnot

The following player received entry as a lucky loser:
  Noelia Bouzó Zanotti

References

External links
 2022 Open Internacional de San Sebastián at ITFtennis.com
 Official website

2022 ITF Women's World Tennis Tour
2022 in Spanish tennis
September 2022 sports events in Spain
October 2022 sports events in Spain